The Cultural Heritage Administration or CHA, formerly the Cultural Properties Administration, is the agency of the South Korean government charged with preserving and promoting Korean cultural heritage. It is headquartered in the city of Daejeon at the Daejeon Government Complex. Previously part of the Ministry of Culture and Tourism, it was elevated to a sub-ministerial agency in 1999.

History
The Cultural Properties Administration was formally established in October 1961, but descends from the Former Royal Properties Administration to the Office created in November 1945 at the beginning of American military rule to replace the Office of the Yi Dynasty. The 1962 Cultural Property Protection Law was modelled on the Japanese 1950 Law for the Protection of Cultural Properties.

Administration
In accordance with Article 2 of the 1962 Cultural Property Protection Law, cultural heritage is classified in four main categories: Tangible Cultural Heritage (including National Treasures); Intangible Cultural Heritage (including Important Intangible Cultural Heritage); Monuments (including Historic Sites, Scenic Sites, and Natural Monuments); and Folklore Cultural Heritage (including both tangible and intangible assets).

In 2010 the CHA was involved with the Gwanghwamun restoration project, where a new name plate on the restored Gate was unveiled on the same day. However, cracks in the wooden plate were showing by early November, where a long vertical crack is visible on the left side of Hanja character "Gwang" and beneath "Hwa" in the middle. The Administration cited the dry autumn weather for the contraction of the wood, but experts differs on that an immature pine board was used to meet the deadline for completion and that the wood had not dried properly.  After many debates, a repair to the cracks was made, and the Government commissioned a new name plate. 13 wooden boards for the new signboard were cut in September 2011 and have since undergone a natural drying process in Gangwon Province. However, in a survey of 5,000 people conducted by the Administration, 58.7 percent responded that the inscription should be in Hangul while 41.3 percent opted Hanja but the long-lost 1395 original was in Hanja. A majority of experts consulted thought the sign should be carved as the original had been.

In December 2012, following the folk song "Arirang" being inscribed on the Representative List of the Intangible Cultural Heritage of Humanity programme by UNESCO, the Administration announced a five-year plan to promote and preserve the song. The plan is aim to support "Arirang" festivals by regional organizations, as well as building an archive for the song, exhibitions, fund research; of which it has allocated .

See also
Korean culture
Heritage preservation in South Korea
National Treasures of South Korea
Important Intangible Cultural Properties of Korea
National Treasures of North Korea
Cultural heritage
Historic preservation
United Nations Memorial Cemetery, in Busan – registered as site 359 in 2007
Philippine Registry of Cultural Property
National Commission for Culture and the Arts

References

External links
 Official website
 Cultural Heritage Administration
 Korean National Heritage Online

Daejeon
Government agencies of South Korea